Al Franken: God Spoke is a 2006 documentary film starring political commentator and future United States Senator Al Franken. The film was made by the same producers of The War Room. It was released in April 2006 at the Tribeca Film Festival and was released in the US in September 2006 starting in New York City.

Plot
In Al Franken: God Spoke, the makers of The War Room capture the emergence of Al Franken as a political commentator. The film is shot over the course of two years and follows Franken from his highly publicized feud with Fox News Channel anchor Bill O'Reilly to his fierce campaign against President George W. Bush during the 2004 election.

The film goes to several different places to catch Franken in real settings. The film crew went with him to Iraq during a USO tour in that country, followed him during his airing on Air America Radio, and during his various campaigns. The film crew is given behind the scenes access as the noted liberal goes up against his rivals. The film features many of those allied with Franken and many of his opponents. Some of his allies in this film include Michael Moore, Al Gore, and Robert F. Kennedy, Jr. Some of his featured opponents include Ann Coulter and Bill O'Reilly.

Cast
Al Franken
Neal Boortz
Ann Coulter
Sean Hannity
Michael Medved

External links
Official website

Interview with Filmmakers

2006 films
2006 documentary films
Documentary films about journalism
Documentary films about American politicians
Films about freedom of expression
Al Franken
2000s English-language films
2000s American films